Manila Village (locally spelt Manilla; ,  or ) was a settlement of Filipino sailors, fishermen and laborers located on an island in Barataria Bay, in Jefferson Parish, Louisiana, United States. The settlements of Saint Malo in St. Bernard Parish was occupied by Filipino sailors who had jumped ship from their Spanish captains, near New Orleans in the year 1763.  In later years, other Filipino countrymen arriving in port at Louisiana would also escape Spanish galleons. This group would later found the Manila Village settlement in the mid-19th century (or earlier). The newly liberated sailors became fishermen who caught and dried shrimp for export to Asia, Canada, South America, and Central America. On July 24, 1870, the Spanish-speaking residents of St. Malo founded the first Filipino social club, called Sociedad de Beneficencia de los Hispano Filipinos, to provide relief and support for the group’s members, including the purchasing of burial places for their deceased. In 1938, the community had a population of 200 people, mostly Filipinos, but also Chinese, Mexicans, and Spaniards.

The settlements were eventually destroyed by hurricanes: Saint Malo by the 1915 New Orleans hurricane and Manila Village by Hurricane Betsy in 1965. As of 2016, only a small remnant  of Manila island, about one acre in size, remains.

In Jefferson Parish, Manila Plaza, located in front of Jean Lafitte Town Hall, holds several historical markers and commemorative plaques acknowledging important figures in the area's Filipino-American history. While there were several settlements scattered along the Louisiana coast in the late 19th century, Manila Village was the largest.

See also
Dried shrimp
Town of Jean Lafitte (History section)
Saint Malo, Louisiana

References

Asian-American culture in Louisiana
Filipino-American history
History of Louisiana
Former populated places in Jefferson Parish, Louisiana